Lavasan-e Bozorg (also Romanized as Lavāsān-e Bozorg, Lavāsān Bozorg) is a village in Lavasan-e Bozorg Rural District, Lavasanat District, Shemiranat County, Tehran Province, Iran.

References 

Populated places in Shemiranat County